Southport Landing (formerly Myer's Landing and Myers Landing) is a locality in Humboldt County, California.

The name "Myers" honors Jacob Myers, a prominent Humboldt Bay citizen in the 1850s. The large white home of the Heneys, a prosperous merchant family, and the home of Seth Kinman remain.

Notable residents
Seth Kinman

References

Former settlements in Humboldt County, California
Populated coastal places in California